The 1955 Cincinnati Redlegs season was a season in American baseball. It consisted of the Redlegs finishing in fifth place in the National League, with a record of 75–79, 23½ games behind the NL and World Series Champion Brooklyn Dodgers.  The Redlegs were managed by Birdie Tebbetts and played their home games at Crosley Field.

Offseason 
 October 1, 1954: Jim Bolger, Harry Perkowski and Ted Tappe were traded by the Redlegs to the Chicago Cubs for Johnny Klippstein and Jim Willis.
 December 8, 1954: Frank Smith was traded by the Redlegs to the St. Louis Cardinals for Ray Jablonski and Gerry Staley.
 February 10, 1955: Lloyd Merriman was purchased from the Redlegs by the Chicago White Sox.
 Prior to 1955 season (exact date unknown)
Jesse Gonder was signed as an amateur free agent by the Redlegs.
Ernie Broglio was acquired from the Cincinnati Redlegs by the Stockton Ports.

Regular season

Season standings

Record vs. opponents

Notable transactions 
 April 30, 1955: Andy Seminick, Glen Gorbous, and Jim Greengrass were traded by the Redlegs to the Philadelphia Phillies for Smoky Burgess, Stan Palys and Steve Ridzik.
 September 10, 1955: Gene Hayden was obtained by the Redlegs from the Seattle Rainiers as part of a working agreement.
 September 14, 1955: Gerry Staley was selected off waivers from the Redlegs by the New York Yankees.

Roster

Player stats

Batting

Starters by position 
Note: Pos = Position; G = Games played; AB = At bats; H = Hits; Avg. = Batting average; HR = Home runs; RBI = Runs batted in

Other batters 
Note: G = Games played; AB = At bats; H = Hits; Avg. = Batting average; HR = Home runs; RBI = Runs batted in

Pitching

Starting pitchers 
Note: G = Games pitched; IP = Innings pitched; W = Wins; L = Losses; ERA = Earned run average; SO = Strikeouts

Other pitchers 
Note: G = Games pitched; IP = Innings pitched; W = Wins; L = Losses; ERA = Earned run average; SO = Strikeouts

Relief pitchers 
Note: G = Games pitched; W = Wins; L = Losses; SV = Saves; ERA = Earned run average; SO = Strikeouts

Farm system 

LEAGUE CO-CHAMPIONS: Douglas

References

External links
1955 Cincinnati Redlegs season at Baseball Reference

Cincinnati Reds seasons
Cincinnati Redlegs season
Cincinnati Redlegs